Fish Lake is a reservoir located  above sea level in Jackson County, Oregon, United States.

Geology
Fish Lake is located between two volcanoes: Mount McLoughlin to the north and Brown Mountain to the south. Two-thousand-year-old andesite lava flows erupted from Brown Mountain surround Fish Lake's southern shore.

History
Fish Lake was originally a small natural lake.
In 1898, the Fish Lake Water Company was established to help irrigate the Rogue Valley. The company proposed to enlarge Fish Lake and nearby Fourmile Lake for added water storage. The temporary Fish Lake Dam was constructed between 1902 and 1908. In 1906, Fourmile Lake Dam was constructed. The two lakes were connected in 1915 by the Cascade Canal, bringing water from Fourmile Lake in the Klamath River watershed over the Cascade Divide to Fish Lake, to supplement Little Butte Creek. The temporary dam was replaced by a permanent earthfill dam.
The dam was modified again in 1922.
In 1955, a new spillway was constructed. An auxiliary spillway was added in 1996. The lake is now about three times its original size.

Statistics

and a  drainage basin.

Fauna
Rainbow trout and brook trout are common in the lake. Osprey and eagles have been spotted in the area.

Recreation

The Pacific Crest Trail passes by Fish Lake's eastern shore.
Three campgrounds are located around the lake.
Popular activities include fishing, swimming, and boating.

See also
 List of lakes in Oregon

References

Reservoirs in Oregon
Lakes of Jackson County, Oregon
Buildings and structures in Jackson County, Oregon
Protected areas of Jackson County, Oregon
Rogue River-Siskiyou National Forest
United States Bureau of Reclamation dams